Ronan Racault (born 2 November 1988 in Blois) is a French road cyclist, who currently rides for French amateur team Guidon Chalettois.

Major results
2011
 4th Overall Ronde de l'Oise
2014
 2nd 
2015
 2nd Paris–Chauny
2016
 2nd Paris–Mantes-en-Yvelines
2017
 6th Paris–Mantes-en-Yvelines
2018
 8th Paris–Mantes-en-Yvelines
2019
 2nd Paris–Mantes-en-Yvelines

References

External links
 

1988 births
Living people
French male cyclists